Brimingen is a municipality in the district of Bitburg-Prüm, in Rhineland-Palatinate, western Germany. In January 2018 the former municipality of Hisel was merged into Brimingen.

References

Bitburg-Prüm